"1, 2, 3, Red Light" is a song written by Sal Trimachi and Bobbi Trimachi and was recorded by 1910 Fruitgum Company for their 1968 album, 1, 2, 3, Red Light. The song charted highest in Canada, going to number 1 on the RPM 100 national singles chart in 1968. In the same year in the US, it went to number 5 on the Billboard Hot 100 and was on the charts for 13 weeks.

The song went to number 2 in South Africa, number 3 on the New Zealand charts, and in Australia it reached number 7. It was named the number 39 song of 1968 on the Cashbox charts. The song was certified as a gold disc in September 1968.

Chart performance

Weekly charts

Year-end charts

Cover versions
Roberto Jordán  recorded a cover, Spanish version of the song on his 1968 album, 1,2,3 ¡Detente!
Ohio Express released a cover version of the song on their 1969 album, Chewy, Chewy.
Talking Heads played the song at some of their early shows and a live version can be found on the bootleg Gimme Heads.
The Pooh Sticks, an indie pop band from Swansea, Wales, covered the song in 1988, releasing it as part of a box of five one-sided 7" singles.

References

1968 songs
1968 singles
1910 Fruitgum Company songs
Ohio Express songs
Talking Heads songs
Buddah Records singles
RPM Top Singles number-one singles